HydroGen3 was an Opel hydrogen fuel cell concept vehicle used for testing in 2006. HydroGen3's  driving range is the highest of any fuel cell vehicle approved for public roads in Japan. The five seater front-wheel driven prototype is based on the Opel Zafira compact MPV.

Technical specifications

 Fuel storage system: there are two hydrogen storage system used:
 liquid hydrogen: stainless steel liquefied hydrogen tank, installed ahead of rear axle under rear seat, length/diameter 1000/400 mm, capacity 68l/4.6 kg, gross weight .
 compressed hydrogen at 700 bar.
 Fuel cell unit: 200 individual fuel cells wired in series, voltage 125-200 V, dimensions: 472×251×496 mm, active area: 800 cm2, pressure: 1.5-2.7 bars, output: 94 kW, power density: 1.6 kW/L or 0.94 kW/kg.
 electric traction system: Three-phase asynchronous electric motor with integrated power electronics and planetary gear, operating voltage: 250-380 V, output: 60 kW, torque: 215 Nm, max. engine rpm: 12000, gear ratio: 8.67:1, gross weight: , dimensions: 4317×1742×1684 mm, vehicle curb weight: 1590 kg (target value), performance: acceleration 0–100 km/h: 16 s, top speed: , operating range: 400 km.

See also
HydroGen4
List of fuel cell vehicles

References

External links 
 https://web.archive.org/web/20070210224533/http://www.gm.com/company/gmability/adv_tech/400_fcv/hydrogen3_in_japan_050103.html

Fuel cell vehicles
HydroGen3